William "Wee Willie" Grundy Davis (December 7, 1906 – April 9, 1981) was an American film actor and professional wrestler. He was born in New York City and died in Louisville, Kentucky, aged 74.

He worked in the Jefferson County Jail in Louisville in 1972–75 as the gym guard.

He was also an engineer and contributed to the invention of the Glowmeter, an early Heads up display that projected a car's speed onto the windshield. A fellow wrestler, "Prince Ilaki Ibn Ali Hassan" (real name Agisilaki Mihalakis), who also fought as the "Mad Greek", was the primary inventor.

Filmography

Shadow of the Thin Man (1941) – Mug (uncredited)
Reap the Wild Wind (1942) – The Lamb
Gentleman Jim (1942) – Flannagan (uncredited)
Arabian Nights (1942) – Valda
Above Suspicion (1943) – Hans – Aschenhausen's Man (uncredited)
Thumbs Up (1943) – Basil (uncredited)
Johnny Come Lately (1943) – Bouncer 
Ali Baba and the Forty Thieves (1944) – Arab Giant (uncredited)
Ghost Catchers (1944) – Mug (uncredited)
Gypsy Wildcat (1944) – Dota (uncredited)
Having Wonderful Crime (1945) – Zacharias, the Porter
Wildfire (1945) – Henchman Moose Harris
Pursuit to Algiers (1945) – Gubec 
Night in Paradise (1946) – Salabaar 
Beware (1946) – Tympani Five Pianist
Bowery Bombshell (1946) – Moose McCall
Fool's Gold (1947) – Blackie
Calendar Girl (1947) – Swedish Tug of War Man (uncredited)
The Foxes of Harrow (1947) – Sailor (uncredited)
The Red Pony (1949) – Truck Driver (uncredited)
Mighty Joe Young (1949) – Strongman (uncredited)
Bodyhold (1949) – Harold Hocksteader aka Azusa Assassin
Samson and Delilah (1949) – Garmiskar 
The Asphalt Jungle (1950) – Timmons 
Abbott and Costello in the Foreign Legion (1950) – Abdullah 
Aladdin and His Lamp (1952) – Gobbo (uncredited)
The World in His Arms (1952) – 'Shanghai' Kelley (uncredited)
Son of Paleface (1952) – Blacksmith
To Catch a Thief (1955) – Big Man in Kitchen (uncredited)
American Hot Wax (1978) – Freed's Friend (final film role)

References

External links

 

American male film actors
American male professional wrestlers
1906 births
1981 deaths
20th-century American male actors
Stampede Wrestling alumni
Professional wrestlers from New York (state)
Professional wrestlers from Kentucky
20th-century professional wrestlers
Professional wrestlers from New York City